Houthaven is a neighbourhood of Amsterdam, Netherlands situated in the West borough. Literally meaning "lumber port", Houthaven is a port situated along the IJ in Amsterdam's western port. It is bordered by a dam in the IJ river to the north and the Spaarndammerbuurt in the south. It is currently predominantly used by inland barges, however plans are in motion to radically change the area in the next few years by building a new residential area on seven artificial islands.

The harbour is made up out of four parts (from east to west): Oude Houthaven (Old Lumber Port), Houthaven, Nieuwe Houthaven (New Lumber Port) and Minervahaven (Minerva Port). This is why the Houthaven is also referred to as the Houthavens (which is the plural).

History 
The Houthaven was dug out in 1876, together with the North Sea Canal. It was the first port in Amsterdam to be dug out (the earlier ones using existing waters). Its purpose was to tranship and store lumber. As lumber was increasingly transported by road, parts of the port were filled up with sand to be used for other purposes in 1945. The Minervahaven remained in use for lumber transhipment and wood processing industry was located there but port-related activities decreased strongly over time. The area is currently being redeveloped.

References

Amsterdam-West
Neighbourhoods of Amsterdam
Houthaven